Amata consimilis is a moth of the subfamily Arctiinae that was described by George Hampson in 1901. It is found in Kenya and Tanzania.

References

 

consimilis
Moths described in 1901
Moths of Africa